In the US state of Iowa, Interstate 29 (I-29) is a north–south Interstate Highway which closely parallels the Missouri River. I-29 enters Iowa from Missouri near Hamburg and heads to the north-northwest through the Omaha–Council Bluffs and the Sioux City areas. It exits the state by crossing the Big Sioux River into South Dakota. For its entire distance through the state, it runs on the flat land between the Missouri River and the Loess Hills.

I-29 was built in sections over a period of 15 years. When there was a shortage of male workers, female workers stepped in to build a  section near Missouri Valley. Between Council Bluffs and Sioux City, I-29 replaced U.S. Highway 75 (US 75) as the major route in western Iowa. As a result of I-29's creation, US 75 south of Sioux City was relocated into Nebraska.

Route description
I-29 enters Iowa south of Hamburg. The Interstate heads northwest, where it meets Iowa Highway 333 (Iowa 333) at a diamond interchange. North of the Iowa 2 interchange, the Interstate straightens out to the north; interchanges serving Percival, Thurman, and Bartlett are spaced out every . At the US 34 interchange near Glenwood, I-29 is joined by US 275.

North of Glenwood, I-29/US 275 continue north toward Council Bluffs. Near Lake Manawa, US 275 splits away from I-29 at the Iowa 92 interchange. Just before I-80 crosses the Missouri River into Nebraska, I-29 immediately turns to the north.  to the north is a modified Y interchange with US 6 and the eastern end of I-480.

North of Council Bluffs, I-29 passes the eastern terminus of I-680 near Crescent. I-29 travels north for  before intersecting with the western terminus of I-880 near Loveland. North of Missouri Valley, the Interstate turns to the northwest toward Modale and then straightens out again south of Mondamin, where I-29 meets the western end of Iowa 127.

North of Onawa, I-29 continues northwest for  toward Sloan, where it meets the western end of Iowa 141. As it approaches the Sioux City metro area, it passes the Sioux Gateway Airport at Sergeant Bluff. At the Singing Hills Boulevard interchange, northbound is joined by southbound U.S. Highway 75 Business (US 75 Bus.).  later, US 75 Bus. ends at the cloverleaf interchange with US 20/US 75, which is also the eastern end of I-129.

The Interstate follows the curve of the river and turns to the west. It meets Gordon Drive, which carries US 20 Bus. US 20 Bus. traffic is directed onto the Interstate for  before it exits via a volleyball interchange, which represents the national northern end of US 77. I-29 continues west along the Missouri River, and, after the Big Sioux River converges into the Missouri, I-29 follows the Big Sioux. Shortly before it crosses the Big Sioux into South Dakota, Iowa 12 splits away to the north.

History

Construction of I-29 began in the late 1950s in the Sioux City area. The first section to open, a  stretch from the Big Sioux River to the then–US 20/US 77 bridge across the Missouri River opened around October 1, 1958. In September 1961, I-29 was extended across the Big Sioux River to South Dakota. On April 1, 1962, some of the northbound directional spans collapsed into the Big Sioux River at the South Dakota state line as a result of flooding and bridge scour.

North of Council Bluffs, a  section to Missouri Valley opened in November 1958. By December 1967, the two sections were connected, creating  of continuous interstate highway. Due to a shortage of male workers, at least 20 women were enlisted to help build this section of I-29. The women were paid $2.00 hourly (equivalent to $ hourly in ), the same wage as men would have earned.

Construction of I-29 in the Council Bluffs area was completed in 1970, and the route was open to Glenwood in the same year. Additional interchanges were added in the Sioux City and Council Bluffs areas between 1970 and 1971. The last  of Interstate were constructed and opened in sections over the next two years; the last section opened on December 15, 1972.

In 2003, US 275 was rerouted onto I-29 from the same interchange near Glenwood northward to Iowa 92 at Council Bluffs. The former US 275 alignment was turned over to Mills and Pottawattamie counties.

Much of I-29 was built next to existing highways, most notably US 75. When the section of I-29 opened between Council Bluffs and Missouri Valley, US 75 was rerouted onto I-29. When construction connecting the Sioux City and Council Bluffs segments was completed, US 75 was again rerouted onto I-29. In the mid-1980s, US 75, from Council Bluffs to Sioux City, was completely rerouted out of Iowa, instead extending up the former US 73 corridor in Nebraska.

Exit list

References

External links

The Iowa Highways Page (I-29)

29
 Iowa
Transportation in Fremont County, Iowa
Transportation in Mills County, Iowa
Transportation in Pottawattamie County, Iowa
Transportation in Harrison County, Iowa
Transportation in Monona County, Iowa
Transportation in Woodbury County, Iowa